Ifeany Victor Onyilo (born 31 October 1990) is a Nigerian football player who plays as a forward. He last played for Portuguese side Cova da Piedade.

Career

Javor
Born in Enugu, he begin his career in Nigeria playing with Chukson.  In summer 2008 he moved to Serbia and signed with FK Javor Ivanjica.  He spent the first season playing on loan at FK Sloga Požega. Being a foreigner with regular performances for so many seasons in the Serbian SuperLiga, earned him a move to the Serbian powerhouse Red Star Belgrade after five seasons spent with mid-table side Javor.

For unknown reasons, many websites wrongly name him "Onyilov" instead of Onyilo.

Red Star Belgrade & Ermis Aradippou 

On August 13, 2013, Onyilo signed a four-year contract with Red Star Belgrade, having played last match with Javor on August 11, precisely against Red Star Belgrade, in which Javor won 4-2, and Onyilo was the scorer of the second goal for Javor and also, was the most responsible for the exclusion of players from the opponent's team. Onyilo played the 2013–14 Serbian SuperLiga with Red Star making 7 appearances but without scoring. At the end of the season the team was restructured, and Onyilo was sent on loan to Ermis Aradippou playing in the Cypriot First Division, where he became prolific goalscorer by scoring 15 goals in 27 appearances in the 2014–15 Cypriot First Division.

Al-Faisaly
In summer 2015, Onyilo signed with Saudi Arabian club Al-Faisaly FC.  He made two appearances with Al-Faisaly in the 2015–16 Saudi Professional League.

Aris Limassol
After Saudi Arabia, Onyilo returned to Cyprus, this time signing in summer 2016 with Aris Limassol FC playing in the Cypriot First Division. He made 3 appearances before released from the club.

Honours
Red Star Belgrade
Serbian SuperLiga: 2013–14

Ermis Aradippou
Cypriot Super Cup: 2014

References

External links 
 Profile at FK Javor official website
 Ifeanyi Victor Onyilo Stats at Utakmica.rs

Living people
1990 births
Footballers from Enugu
Association football forwards
Nigerian footballers
Nigerian expatriate footballers
FK Javor Ivanjica players
Red Star Belgrade footballers
Ermis Aradippou FC players
Aris Limassol FC players
Al-Faisaly FC players
PAE Kerkyra players
C.D. Cova da Piedade players
Serbian SuperLiga players
Cypriot First Division players
Saudi Professional League players
Liga Portugal 2 players
Expatriate footballers in Serbia
Expatriate footballers in Cyprus
Expatriate footballers in Saudi Arabia
Expatriate footballers in Greece
Expatriate footballers in Bangladesh
Nigerian expatriate sportspeople in Serbia
Nigerian expatriate sportspeople in Cyprus
Nigerian expatriate sportspeople in Saudi Arabia
Nigerian expatriate sportspeople in Greece
Nigerian expatriate sportspeople in Bangladesh